The 1991–92 Buffalo Sabres season was the 22nd season for the National Hockey League franchise that was established on May 22, 1970. The season saw the Sabres finish in third place in the Adams Division with a record of 31 wins, 37 losses, and 12 ties for 74 points. They lost the Adams Division Semi-final to the Boston Bruins in seven games.

Offseason

NHL Draft

Regular season

The Sabres ended the regular season with the most power-play goals scored, with 105, and the best power-play percentage, with 22.53%.

Season standings

Schedule and results

Pat Lafontaine
LaFontaine, frustrated with his situation on Long Island, turned down a four-year, $6 million contract offer and refused to report to the Islanders for the start of the 1991–92 NHL season.  Three weeks into the season, on October 25, 1991, LaFontaine was traded, along with teammate Randy Wood, to the Buffalo Sabres for four players, including former first overall pick Pierre Turgeon.

Playoffs
1992 Stanley Cup playoffs

Awards and records
Led by Rob Ray's 354 penalty minutes, the Buffalo Sabres set an NHL record for team penalty minutes in a season, with 2713.

References
 Sabres on Hockey Database

Buffalo Sabres seasons
Buffalo
Buffalo
Buffalo
Buffalo